My Homies Part 2 is the eighth studio album by American rapper Scarface. The album was released on March 7, 2006, by Rap-A-Lot Records, Asylum Records and Atlantic Records. It is the sequel to his 1998 collaborative album, My Homies. Released as a double album, My Homies Part 2 was a commercial success, having made it to 12 on the Billboard 200.

Track listing

Chart positions

Weekly charts

Year-end charts

References

2006 albums
Sequel albums
Scarface (rapper) albums
Rap-A-Lot Records albums
Albums produced by N.O. Joe
Albums produced by Kanye West
Albums produced by The Legendary Traxster
Albums produced by Mike Dean (record producer)